Ultimate Ride is a video game by Disney Interactive for Microsoft Windows in which players design, engineer and ride virtual roller coasters.

Development and release
It was released on September 26, 2001, alongside a website, by Walt Disney Imagineering, for members to upload and share their designs and rate rides based on Adrenaline, Technique and Originality. Designers of each week's five top-rated rides were awarded "Roller God" titles.

Two versions released in 2002, "Ultimate Ride Coaster Deluxe" and "Disney Coaster", added new features. The website closed in 2003.

Reception

The game received "average" reviews according to the review aggregation website Metacritic. Eric Bratcher of NextGen said of the game: "It's slightly under-ambitious, but this is one ride that you should definitely consider taking".

References

External links
 

2001 video games
Roller coaster games and simulations
Video games scored by Jack Wall
Video games developed in the United States
Windows games
Windows-only games